Alex A. Espinoza (born May 31, 1964) is a former National Football League quarterback who played for one season with the Kansas City Chiefs. He went to college at Iowa State after transferring from Cal State-Fullerton. During the strike shortened season of 1987 he was picked up as an undrafted free agent to serve as a backup quarterback by Kansas City and played in only one game. He compiled 69 yards on 9 out of 14 attempts with two interceptions and five rushing yards in his lone NFL game, a 42–0 loss at Miami in his lone NFL year.

External links
Stats from NFL.com

1964 births
Living people
American football quarterbacks
Cal State Fullerton Titans football players
Frankfurt Galaxy players
Iowa State Cyclones football players
Kansas City Chiefs players
Players of American football from Los Angeles
National Football League replacement players